Katharyne Mitchell (born 20 February 1961) is an American geographer who is currently a Distinguished Professor of Sociology and the Dean of the Social Sciences at the University of California, Santa Cruz.

Background 
Mitchell grew up in Boston, Massachusetts and graduated from Princeton University with a B.A. in Art and Archaeology. She received her M.A. and Ph.D. in Geography from the University of California, Berkeley under the direction of Allan Pred. Mitchell was previously Professor of Geography at the University of Washington, and held the inaugural position as Simpson Professor of the Public Humanities from 2004–2007. She was a visiting professor at St. Catherine's College and Hertford College at the University of Oxford in 2000–2001.

Scholarship 
The recipient of Guggenheim and Brocher Foundation fellowships, Mitchell's research spans several categories including migration, citizenship, critical race theory, transnationalism, urban political geography, critical humanitarian studies, education, and geographies of religion. Her current research examines the spaces of migration, faith and sanctuary in the context of the current refugee situation in Europe. She has also written on celebrity humanitarianism and philanthropy in the context of late neoliberalism, including publications on Bono’s ONE campaign.

Mitchell’s 2004 book, Crossing the Neoliberal Line: Pacific Rim Migration and the Metropolis, is regarded as “an important contribution to urban and transnational studies.” Her 2008 edited volume, Practising Public Scholarship: Experiences and Possibilities Beyond the Academy, brings together work from scholars such as Terry Eagleton, Howard Zinn, Doreen Massey, Michael Burawoy, and Don Mitchell, and has been called “one of the best books on what it really means to be a public intellectual.”

Key concepts 
 Transnationalism – Throughout her career, Mitchell has developed a geographical understanding of transnational processes and discourses. Her theory of transnationalism requires that global processes of capitalism be viewed in tandem with cross-border movements and hybrid spaces. Mitchell's early work develops this theory from a spatial ethnography of transnational migration and urban change in Vancouver. Called “innovative” and “empirically rich,” this ethnography demonstrated how the practices of Chinese transnational migrants to Pacific Rim cities like Vancouver have complicated traditional notions of “citizenship,” “home,” and “cultural difference.” Understanding the spaces of transnationalism, Mitchell shows, is crucial in grasping the rise of neoliberal policies and practice. More recently, Mitchell's work has explored transnationalism in the context of church asylum and spaces of sanctuary for migrants and refugees in Europe. She has also developed the concept of transnational topologies, according to which borders and territories are not fixed but continuously maintained, challenged, and redefined.
 Diaspora – Mitchell has critiqued the assumption that the diasporic is necessarily equated with a politically progressive agenda. She shows how, within cultural studies, diaspora has been celebrated as a subversive “third space,” along with related concepts like hybridity and liminality. However, the focus on diaspora as a linguistic and cultural disruption to hegemonic norms, Mitchell argues, neglects the ways in which diasporic and other liminal subject positions have been used strategically for purposes of capital accumulation. While maintaining the diasporic as a potential site of resistance, Mitchell cautions against the uncritical affirmation of such third spaces.
 Multiculturalism – Mitchell's critical account of multiculturalism views the latter as both a liberal concept and a potential site of political resistance. On the one hand, Mitchell has shown how concepts of multicultural citizenship and multicultural education emerged in Canada, and to a lesser extent in the US and UK, after World War II as part of a larger set of policies and discourses surrounding the liberal state. In places like Vancouver, doctrines of multiculturalism have attempted to smooth racial friction and subdue resistance to capitalist development and various forms of governance. However, particularly in her work on education, Mitchell has shown how the concepts and practices of multiculturalism have shifted in response to the spatial, digital, cultural, and economic transformations of neoliberal globalization. In Canada, for instance, the national experiment in multiculturalism has been increasingly deemed a failure by neoliberal actors at the state level. Given the political-economic contexts of globalization, Mitchell argues that engagements with multiculturalism today can have potentially progressive outcomes if grounded in real-world practices. Mitchell has demonstrated this in her own experimentations with strategies of multicultural education. In teaching school children mapping skills, she found that they were better able to challenge forms of spatial injustice and to acknowledge different—multicultural—ways of being, doing, and knowing.

Selected publications 

 2022. Sanctuary Space, Racialized Violence, and Memories of Resistance (coauthored with Key MacFarlane). Annals of the American Association of Geographers.
 2020. Hotspot Geopolitics versus Geosocial Solidarity: Contending Constructions of Safe Space for Migrants in Europe (coauthored with Matthew Sparke). Environment and Planning D: Society and Space 32(6): 1046-1066.
 2019. Handbook on Critical Geographies of Migration (co-edited with Reece Jones and Jennifer Fluri). London: Edward Elgar Press.
 2018. Making Workers: Radical Geographies of Education. London: Pluto Press.
 2017. Freedom, Faith, and Humanitarian Governance: the Spatial Politics of Church Asylum in Europe. Space and Polity 21(3): 269-288.
 2016. The New Washington Consensus: Millennial Philanthropy and the Making of Global Market Subjects (coauthored with Matthew Sparke). Antipode 48(3): 724–749.
2015. It’s Time: The Cultural Politics of Memory in the Current Moment of Danger, in H. Merrill and L. Hoffman (eds.) Spaces of Danger: Culture and Power in the Everyday, University of Georgia Press, 21-37. 
2014. The Grassroots and the Gift: Moral Authority, American Philanthropy, and Activism in Education (coauthored with Chris Lizotte). Foucault Studies 18, 66-89.       
 2013. Intergenerational Mapping and the Cultural Politics of Memory (coauthored with Sarah Elwood). Space and Polity 17(1): 33–52.
 2012. Mapping Children's Politics: The Promise of Articulation and the Limits of Nonrepresentational Theory (coauthored with Sarah Elwood). Environment and Planning D: Society and Space 30(5): 788–804.
 2011. Marseille's Not for Burning: Comparative Networks of Integration and Exclusion in Two French Cities. Annals of the Association of American Geographers 101(2):404–423.
 2010. Ungoverned Space: Global Security and the Geopolitics of Broken Windows. Political Geography 29(5): 289–297.
 2009. Pre-Black Futures. Antipode 41(s1): 239–261.
 2008. Practising Public Scholarship: Experiences and Possibilities Beyond the Academy (editor). Oxford: Blackwell Publications.
 2007. Geographies of Identity: the Intimate Cosmopolitan. Progress in Human Geography 31(5): 706–720.
 2006. Neoliberal Governmentality in the European Union: Education, Training, and Technologies of Citizenship. Environment and Planning D: Society and Space. 24(3): 389–407.
2005. Veiling, Secularism and the Neoliberal Subject: National Narratives and Supranational Desires in Turkey and France (coauthored with Banu Gokariksel). Global Networks 5, 2: 147-165.    
 2004. Crossing the Neoliberal Line: Pacific Rim Migration and the Metropolis. Philadelphia: Temple University Press.
2004. Life’s Work: Geographies of Social Reproduction (co-edited with Sallie Marston and Cindi Katz). Oxford: Blackwell Publications. 
 2003. A Companion Guide to Political Geography (co-edited with John A. Agnew and Gerard Toal). Oxford: Blackwell Publications.
 2001. Transnationalism, Neo-liberalism, and the Rise of the Shadow State. Economy and Society 30(2): 165–189.
 1997. Transnational Discourse: Bringing Geography Back In. Antipode 29(2): 101–114.
 1993. Multiculturalism, or the United Colors of Capitalism? Antipode 25(4): 263–294.

References 

University of California, Berkeley alumni
American geographers
American social scientists
1961 births
Living people
University of California, Santa Cruz faculty
Women geographers